R.Pudupalayam is a village panchayat near Rasipuram municipal corporation in Namakkal district in the Indian state of Tamil Nadu.  
People use the bus to commute for their business to the nearest location for business and personal works. It is famous for handloom cotton sarees and silk sarees manufacturing.

References
 Tamil Nadu Government - Namakkal District - Rasipuram Taluk
 List of Polling Station for Rasipuram Assembly Segment

Kaviyarasan Ramalingam 06:23, 31 May 2011 (UTC)

Villages in Namakkal district